Samar Kokash (born August 26, 1972) is a Syrian actress.

Biography
Kokash graduated from the Higher Institute of Theatrical Arts in Syria in 1995, participated in many of the works in the theater, radio and television also worked in the dubbing, retired from the field of art and wore the veil and say, artistic appearance. The daughter of director Aladdin Kokash and actress Malak Sukkar.

She was imprisoned from late 2013 to February 2017 by the Syrian regime during the Syrian Civil War.

Filmography

Dubbing roles
The Adventures of Lolo the Penguin (Venus Centre version)
Adventures of Sonic the Hedgehog (Venus Centre version)
The All New Popeye Hour – Olive Oyl (second voice)
Popeye and Son – Olive Oyl
Bakugan Battle Brawlers – Rawya (Runo Misaki), Jamal (Osamu Jō)
Bakugan Battle Brawlers: New Vestroia – Rawya (Runo Misaki), Baron Leltoy
Bakugan: Gundalian Invaders – Ren Krawler
Bakusō Kyōdai Let's & Go!! MAX – Goki Ichimonji
Bartok the Magnificent – Additional Voices
Battle B-Daman – Tain (Tsubame Tsubakura), Cain (Enjyu)
Battle B-Daman: Fire Spirits! – Tain (Tsubame Tsubakura), Cain (Enjyu)
Ben 10 – Gwen Tennyson
Beyblade – Hiromi Tachibana
Beyblade: Metal Fusion – Yu Tendo
Black Cat – Kyoko Kirisaki
Chiquititas – Veronica "Vero" Cisneros
Cyborg Kuro-chan – Mikun
Detective Conan – Ran Mōri 
Detective Conan: The Time-Bombed Skyscraper – Ran Mōri
Detective Conan: The Fourteenth Target – Ran Mōri
Detective Conan: The Last Wizard of the Century – Ran Mōri
Detective Conan: Captured in Her Eyes – Ran Mōri
 Detective Conan: Zero the Enforcer – Ran Mōri
Digimon Adventure – Mimi Tachikawa (first voice), Gabumon (first voice)
Digimon Tamers – Culumon
Dragon Ball – Son Goku
Dragon Ball Z – Son Gohan
Fushigi Yûgi – Miaka Yūki
Golden Warrior Gold Lightan
Hamtaro – Laura Haruna (Hiroko Haruna), Snoozer (Neteru-kun), Cappy (Kaburu-kun)
Hamtaro: Adventures in Ham-Ham Land – Laura Haruna (Hiroko Haruna), Snoozer (Neteru-kun), Cappy (Kaburu-kun)
Hamtaro: The Captive Princess – Laura Haruna (Hiroko Haruna), Snoozer (Neteru-kun), Cappy (Kaburu-kun)
Hamtaro: Ham Ham Grand Prix - The Miracle of Aurora Valley – Laura Haruna (Hiroko Haruna), Snoozer (Neteru-kun), Cappy (Kaburu-kun)
Hamtaro: The Mysterious Ogre's Picture Book Tower - Laura Haruna (Hiroko Haruna), Snoozer (Neteru-kun), Cappy (Kaburu-kun)
Horseland – Sarah Whitney
Idaten Jump – Makoto Shido
Idol Densetsu Eriko – Asami Seyama
Inuyasha – Mayu Ikeda
Iron Kid – Violet (uncredited)
The Kidsongs Television Show – Triskin Potter, Alexandra Picatto
The Magic School Bus (Venus Centre version)
Make Way for Noddy – Noddy
Les Misérables: Shōjo Cosette – Gavroche (first voice)
Monster Rancher – Holly
One Piece – Nami, Roronoa Zoro (child)
Opti-Morphs - KINSON
Pappyland
The Powerpuff Girls – Tamara (Bubbles) (Venus Centre version)
Pretty Rhythm – Sonata Amamiya (Venus Centre version)
Ranma ½ – Shampoo
Sakura Wars – Iris Chateaubriand
Strawberry Shortcake
Frutillita
Strawberry Shortcake: The Sweet Dreams Movie
Super Little Fanta Heroes (Venus Centre version)
Super Wings - Jett (Venus Centre version)
Tama and Friends – Tama
Tsuyoshi Shikkari Shinasai
VS Knight Ramune & 40 Fire – Baba Lamunade
Wish Kid – Nicholas "Nick" McClary
Rainbow Ruby - Ramon
Horton Hears a Who! (Classical Arabic Version)

References

External links
Samar Kokash at ElCinema

 (as Samar Kukes)

Syrian television actresses
Syrian voice actresses
Living people
1972 births
Syrian stage actresses
People from Damascus
Higher Institute of Dramatic Arts (Damascus) alumni